Wireless triangulation is a method of determining the location of wireless nodes using IEEE 802.11 standards.
It is normally implemented by measuring the RSSI signals strength.

See also 
 Location awareness
 Real-time locating standards
 Wireless local area network
 Wireless personal area network

References

Radio-frequency identification
Radio navigation
Tracking
Wireless locating